Epsilon Delphini (ε Delphini, abbreviated Eps Del, ε Del), officially named Aldulfin , is a solitary, blue-white hued star  in the northern constellation of Delphinus. It is visible to the naked eye with an apparent visual magnitude of 4.03. Based upon an annual parallax shift of 9.87 mas as seen from the Earth, the system is located about 330 light-years from the Sun. At Epsilon Delphini's distance, the visual magnitude is diminished by an extinction factor of 0.11 due to interstellar dust. The star is moving closer to the Sun with a radial velocity of −19 km/s.

This is a B-type giant star with a stellar classification of B6 III. It has 4.6 times the Sun's radius and is radiating 676 times the solar luminosity from its photosphere at an effective temperature of 13,614 K. The star may be slightly variable, occasionally brightening to magnitude 3.95. It is spinning with a projected rotational velocity of 52 km/s.

Proper names

ε Delphini (Latinised to Epsilon Delphini) is the star's Bayer designation.

The star bore the traditional Arabic name ðanab ad-dulfīn or Dzaneb al Delphin, which appeared in the catalogue of stars in the Calendarium of Al Achsasi Al Mouakket and which was translated into Latin as Cauda Delphini, meaning 'the dolphin's tail'. In 2016, the IAU organized a Working Group on Star Names (WGSN) to catalog and standardize proper names for stars. The WGSN approved the name Aldulfin for this star on 5 September 2017 and it is now so included in the List of IAU-approved Star Names.

From this Chinese name, the name Pae Chaou was formed.

References

B-type giants
Suspected variables
Delphinus (constellation)
Delphini, Epsilon
Aldulfin
Durchmusterung objects
Delphini, 02
195810
101421
7852